Bieganowo may refer to the following places:
Bieganowo, Środa Wielkopolska County in Greater Poland Voivodeship (west-central Poland)
Bieganowo, Września County in Greater Poland Voivodeship (west-central Poland)
Bieganowo, Kuyavian-Pomeranian Voivodeship (north-central Poland)